Charles Schwab Field Omaha (formerly TD Ameritrade Park Omaha) is a baseball park in Omaha, Nebraska. Opened in 2011, the stadium serves as a replacement for historic Johnny Rosenblatt Stadium.

Charles Schwab Field has a seating capacity of 24,000, with the ability to expand to 35,000 spectators. The ballpark was expected to cost US$128 million to construct and is located near the CHI Health Center Omaha. The park turned a profit of $5.6 million in its first year of operation, easily covering its debt payments.

It is the home field of the Creighton University Bluejays baseball team, and the host venue of the College World Series—the final rounds of the NCAA Division I Baseball Championship. The College World Series has been held in Omaha since 1950, and will continue to be hosted there through at least 2035. The Big Ten Conference has also held its baseball tournament at the venue, first in 2014 and 2016, and from 2018 through 2022. Attempts were made to bring a professional baseball team to the field, but legal troubles prevented this. The local Pacific Coast League franchise, the Omaha Storm Chasers (formerly Royals), opted for a smaller capacity venue at the new Werner Park, west of Papillion. In 2021, Charles Schwab  announced it would be retaining the naming rights to the park following their acquisition of TD Ameritrade in 2020; the TD Ameritrade Park Omaha was subsequently renamed the Charles Schwab Field Omaha.

History 

Groundbreaking for TD Ameritrade Park occurred January 21, 2009. It was announced on June 8, 2009, that TD Ameritrade, a company based in Omaha, will carry the naming rights for the new stadium. The official announcement came from TD Ameritrade's Chief Executive Officer Fred Tomczyk on June 10, 2009.

On April 15, 2010, it was announced that the Omaha Nighthawks, the local franchise in the United Football League, would play their first season in Johnny Rosenblatt Stadium and then move to TD Ameritrade for 2011 and beyond. The football gridiron was laid along a line extending from home plate down the first base line into right field. The United Football League suspended all play midway though its 2012 season and then dissolved afterwards, marking the end of professional football at TD Ameritrade Park.

In December 2010, it was announced that Omaha would host a six-day multi-genre music festival in July called Red Sky Music Festival. Concerts were to be held all day in the parking lots of CenturyLink Center and TD Ameritrade Park. Each night there was to be a main concert held inside TD Ameritrade Park and CenturyLink Center. The festival lasted just two years, 2011 and 2012.

The original Hammond organ from Rosenblatt Stadium has been restored and is used during games at TD Ameritrade, although musician Lambert Bartak (retired after the 2010 CWS, died in 2013) would not be the organist.

On February 9, 2013, the ballpark hosted outdoor ice hockey at the "Mutual of Omaha Battles on Ice." The first game featured the junior Omaha Lancers and the Lincoln Stars of the USHL. The second game was a collegiate matchup between the Nebraska–Omaha Mavericks and the University of North Dakota of the WCHA.

In May 2014, it was announced that a franchise in the new Fall Experimental Football League, called the Omaha Mammoths, would play their home games at TD Ameritrade Park beginning in October. The Mammoths would only play one shortened season in Omaha.

In 2014 and 2016, TD Ameritrade Park hosted the Big Ten Conference's baseball championship. A four-year contract was soon reached to hold the tournament there from 2018 through 2022.

On June 21, 2018, Major League Baseball announced that a regular season game between the Kansas City Royals and Detroit Tigers would be played at TD Ameritrade Park on June 13, 2019, ahead of the 2019 College World Series. The Royals won the MLB in Omaha game 7–3 with 25,454 people in attendance.

First game 

The first regular season college baseball game was played on April 19, 2011, between the Nebraska Cornhuskers and host Creighton Bluejays. The ceremonial first pitch was thrown out by TD Ameritrade CEO Fred Tomczyk. It was a game of many firsts for the park including first balk and first hamster races. The Cornhuskers won 2–1 in front of a paid attendance of just over 22,000 (a sellout) and a scanned attendance of just over 18,000, making it the most attended game of the collegiate regular season.

During its first season, the Missouri Valley Conference baseball tournament was held at the ballpark in late May, the third time Creighton had hosted the event.

First College World Series 
TD Ameritrade Park hosted its first College World Series in June 2011. Participants were South Carolina Gamecocks, Florida Gators, Vanderbilt Commodores, Virginia Cavaliers, North Carolina Tar Heels, California Golden Bears, Texas A&M Aggies, and Texas Longhorns.

Before the opening game of the CWS between Vanderbilt and North Carolina on Saturday, June 18, the ceremonial first pitch was delivered by former President George W. Bush. Omaha Little Leaguer Henry Slagle had the honor of handing the ball to President Bush as his Memorial Park Little League team greeted the former president on the field. Before the pitch, his father, former President George H. W. Bush, who played for Yale in the first CWS in 1947, delivered a video message christening the new facility. Omaha's own Gene Klosner sang the stadium's first CWS national anthem prior to the game. Attendance for the first game was set at 22,745, standing room only, fans. The first CWS pitch at the new park was thrown by UNC's Patrick Johnson to Vanderbilt's Tony Kemp at exactly 1:11 PM Central Daylight Time. Vanderbilt's Connor Harrell hit the first CWS home run in the park in the sixth inning of the game, a two-run blast over the left field wall, as the Commodores went on to beat North Carolina 7–3.

The first CWS finals in the new ballpark began on Monday, June 27, at 7 PM between the South Carolina Gamecocks and their SEC Eastern Division Rivals, the Florida Gators, in front of 25,851 fans.

Other worthy notes about the park's first CWS were the Southeastern Conference's Eastern Division South Carolina, Florida and Vanderbilt completing a podium clean sweep, and the 2011 CWS All-Tournament Team being comprised completely of players from the SEC East.

This was also the first year in which the new BBCOR Composite baseball bat (Batted Ball Coefficient of Restitution) standard was ushered-in. Meant to reduce the speed of the ball off the bat while lessening the potential for injury to players, particularly pitchers. The new bat also proved to negate the long ball which has caused critics to claim that the new park is too large for the toned-down bats and makes the exciting home run ball a thing of the past in the CWS. Also, pitchers were held to a strict 25 second clock between pitches for the first time in the history of the College World Series. The pitch clock was instituted in an effort to shorten the games. In 2011, the average total session (game) time was 3:10 with the longest game at 4:25, the shortest at 2:38, the Championship game at 3:21 and only one of the 14 sessions took over four hours to complete.

Attendance

College World Series 
The 2011 CWS, the first played at TD Ameritrade Park, consisted of 14 sessions with a total attendance of 321,684 for an average session attendance of 22,977.  The 2011 total was both the highest since 2005 and 2,294 spectators more than the 2010 per-game average of 20,683.

In 2022, Ole Miss took home the College World Series title after sweeping Oklahoma in the finals. The ballpark saw new records set for attendance as the 2022 CWS set a new attendance record with 366,105 fans over 15 games in Omaha. That past the record of 361,711 fans set in 2021. Sunday's final saw 25,972 fans, which was 1,467 over stadium capacity and the biggest crowd in a College World Series finals game since 2017.

TD Ameritrade Park is becoming well known for its lack of home runs leading to the idea that teams must play small ball to win. Nevertheless, KJ Harrison from Oregon State hit a grand slam—the first ever in the ballpark during the College World Series—to deep left-center field in June 2017, during a 13–1 win over Louisiana State. The first grand slam in TD Ameritrade Park was hit by Creighton in a game against Utah Valley.

Creighton 
In 2013, Creighton ranked tenth among Division I baseball programs in attendance, averaging 4,041 per game.

Omaha Nighthawks 
The Omaha Nighthawks competed in TD Ameritrade Park in the former United Football League.  The highest attendance for a Nighthawks game at TD Ameritrade Park was 17,697, for the October 15, 2011 game against the Las Vegas Locomotives. The lowest attendance, almost exactly a year later on October 17, 2012, was 2,234, with the Locomotives also the opponent.

Big Ten Conference tournament 
The first Big Ten Conference baseball tournament to be played at TD Ameritrade Park was held in 2014. The championship game of that tournament was attended by 19,965 spectators, which remains a record for single-day attendance at an NCAA conference tournament game. The Indiana Hoosiers defeated the Nebraska Cornhuskers, 8–4, to claim the Big Ten title. The tournament was once again hosted at TD Ameritrade Park in 2016. Beginning in 2018, the Big Ten Conference arranged for TD Ameritrade Park to host its tournament every season until 2022.

See also 

 List of NCAA Division I baseball venues
 Sports in Omaha
 Downtown Omaha
 MLB in Omaha

References

External links 

Retrosheet details of the 2019 MLB game

Sports venues in Omaha, Nebraska
Creighton Bluejays baseball
College baseball venues in the United States
College World Series venues
Sports venues completed in 2011
United Football League (2009–2012) venues
Omaha Nighthawks stadiums
Baseball venues in Nebraska
Outdoor ice hockey venues in the United States
Omaha Mammoths
2011 establishments in Nebraska
American football venues in Nebraska